Home Before Dark is an  American mystery drama streaming television series created by Dana Fox and Dara Resnik and produced for Apple TV+. The series is inspired by the life of young journalist Hilde Lysiak and stars Brooklynn Prince, Jim Sturgess, Abby Miller, Louis Herthum, Michael Weston, Kiefer O'Reilly, Kylie Rogers, Aziza Scott, Adrian Hough, Joelle Carter, Jibrail Nantambu, and Deric McCabe. It premiered on April 3, 2020. The second season premiered on June 11, 2021.

Premise
Home Before Dark follows "a young girl who moves from Brooklyn to the small coastal town her father left behind. While there, her dogged pursuit of the truth leads her to unearth a cold case that everyone in town, including her own father, tried hard to bury."

Cast

Main
 Brooklynn Prince as Hilde Lisko
 Jim Sturgess as Matthew Lisko
 Abby Miller as Bridget Jensen
 Louis Herthum as Frank Briggs Sr. (season 1; guest season 2)
 Michael Weston as Frank Briggs Jr.
 Kylie Rogers as Izzy Lisko
 Aziza Scott as Mackenzie "Trip" Johnson
 Adrian Hough as Jack Fife (season 1; guest season 2)
 Joelle Carter as Kim Collins
 Jibrail Nantambu as Donny Davis
 Deric McCabe as Wesley "Spoon" Witherspoon
 Rio Mangini as Ethan (season 2; recurring season 1)

Recurring
 Reed Birney as Sylvester Lisko
 Mila Morgan as Ginny Lisko
 Kiefer O'Reilly as Richie Fife
 Nicholas Holmes as Young Frank
 Dean Petriw as Young Matt
 Whitney Peak as Alpha Jessica
 Michael Greyeyes as Sam Gillis
 Sarah Giles as Beta Jessica
 Aubrey Arnason as Lucy Fife
 Malcolm Sparrow-Crawford as Young Sam Gillis
 James Sanders as Mr. Sipple
 Laiken Laverock as Young Kim 
 Sharon Lawrence as Carol Collins (season 1)
 Serge Houde as Roger Collins (season 1)
 Mark Gibbon as Karl Kurz (season 2)
 Scott Lawrence as Mackenzie Johnson Jr. (season 2)
 Alexa Mansour as Emma (season 2)
 Damon Runyan as Paul Rutherford (season 2)

Episodes

Season 1 (2020)

Season 2 (2021)

Production

Development
On August 25, 2016, it was reported that Paramount Television Studios and Anonymous Content had optioned the screen rights to Hilde and Matthew Lysiak's forthcoming book series, Hilde Cracks the Case. The deal also reportedly include Hilde's life rights as well. Paramount Television Studios was expected to act as lead production company, and Joy Gorman Wettels and Sharlene Martin were set to serve as executive producers.

On June 13, 2018, it was announced that Apple had given the untitled production a series order for a first season consisting of ten episodes. The series was created by Dana Fox and Dara Resnik, both of whom are set to executive produce alongside Wettels, Martin, and Jon M. Chu. Production companies involved with the series were set to include Anonymous Content and Paramount Television Studios.

Casting
On August 17, 2018, it was announced that Brooklynn Prince had been cast in the series' lead role. On October 23, 2018, it was reported that Jim Sturgess had been cast in a starring role. In November 2018, it was announced that Abby Miller, Louis Herthum, Michael Weston, Kylie Rogers, Aziza Scott, Adrian Hough, Joelle Carter, Jibrail Nantambu, and Deric McCabe had joined the cast in series regular roles.

Filming
Principal photography for the first season was scheduled to take place from November 12, 2018 to April 15, 2019 in Vancouver, British Columbia, Canada.

Apple renewed the series for a second season before the first season had aired, which Dana Fox called "an enormous vote of confidence". Filming for the second season was set to take place in Vancouver from January 27 to June 17, 2020. Production of the second season was shut down on March 13, due to the COVID-19 pandemic, during filming of the fourth episode. Production on the season resumed on September 14, 2020 and concluded on January 28, 2021.
 
Initially untitled, the series was known as Magic Hour before being renamed Home Before Dark. "Magic Hour" became the title of the pilot episode.

Cinematographer Alice Brooks shot the series with Panavision Millennium DXL2 digital cameras and customized Panavision G-Series anamorphic lenses.

Reception 
On Rotten Tomatoes, the series has an approval rating of 81% based on 32 reviews, with an average rating of 6.21/10. The website's critical consensus is, "Home Before Dark central mystery is more intriguing than its mawkish writing lets on, but Brooklyn Prince's fiercely dedicated performance more than makes up for any narrative shortcomings." On Metacritic, it has a weighted average score of 64 out of 100, based on 12 critics, indicating "generally favorable reviews".

References

External links
  – official site
 
 
 

2020 American television series debuts
2020s American crime drama television series
2020s American mystery television series
2020s American teen drama television series
Apple TV+ original programming
English-language television shows
Mystery drama web series
Television productions suspended due to the COVID-19 pandemic
Television series about teenagers
Television series based on actual events
Television series by Anonymous Content
Television series by Paramount Television
Television shows filmed in Vancouver
Television shows set in Washington (state)